Wilhelm Pieck – Das Leben unseres Präsidenten (Wilhelm Pieck: the Life of Our President) is a 1952 East German documentary film directed by Andrew Thorndike about the life of GDR President Wilhelm Pieck. It opened on 2 January 1952 in the cinemas of East Germany and East Berlin. The film consists mainly of still images illustrating Pieck's life and related German history. There are only a few motion picture sequences, for example Lenin's funeral and the post-1945 period.

Reception
According to Neues Deutschland, run by the Socialist Unity Party of Germany, the film had "overwhelming success" and the cinemas were sold out. Der Spiegel commented that the film "covered the last 50 years of Marxist rule".

In 1951, Wilhelm Pieck – Das Leben unseres Präsidenten was the opening film of Czechoslovakia's German Film Week. Director and screenwriter Andrew Thorndike was awarded the National Prize of East Germany, third class, for the film.

References

External links
 

1952 films
1952 documentary films
German documentary films
East German films
1950s German-language films
Films directed by Andrew Thorndike
German black-and-white films
1950s German films